Pardesi is a 1993 Hindi action film Hindi Action film starring Mithun Chakraborty and Varsha Usgaonkar in lead roles and Shakti Kapoor, Sumalatha in supporting roles.  The movie is available at Rotten Tomatoes.

Plot 
Pardesi is the story of young villager Shiva who along with his family wants to be free from the claws of slavery imposed upon by the village Thakur and Lala since many generations.

Shiva decides to leave village and go to big city in search of new life but tragedy stuck, he is caught by the police for a heinous murder.

Judge Rajiv Verma (Suresh Oberoi) finds Shiva guilty and pronounces death penalty on him.

Before Shiva could be hanged he expresses his last wish to meet the Judge the one who had sentenced him.

Judge comes, meets Shiva who once again talks of his innocence but before his hanging Shiva also pronounces a sentence on Judge - that only he should go to his family and break the news of his death to his wife - father, sister an young son.

Judge affix a great mental turmoil comes to the village to disclose Shiva's hanging but cannot because of the plight of the family which he sees with his own eyes. He leaves everything to almighty.

To the shock and dismay one day Judge sees a handcuffed criminal Shankar is duplicate of Shiva.

Cast 

 Mithun Chakraborty as Shiva & Shanker
 Varsha Usgaonkar as Shanker's girlfriend
 Iqbal Durrani as Thakur
 Pankaj Dheer as Hussain
 Sumalatha as Shanti
 Shakti Kapoor - Lala
 Suresh Oberoi - Judge Rajiv Verma

Soundtrack

The music for Pardesi was composed by the duo Anand–Milind, Nikhil–Vinay and lyrics were written by Sameer, Yogesh.

References 

Films directed by Raj N. Sippy
Films scored by Anand–Milind
Films scored by Nikhil-Vinay
1990s Hindi-language films
Indian action films